Bradley is an English masculine given name and surname.

Bradley may also refer to:

Places

In the United Kingdom
In England:
 Bradley, Cheshire
 Bradley, Derbyshire
 Bradley (house), a manor in Kingsteignton, Devon
 Bradley, Gloucestershire
 Bradley, Hampshire
 Bradley, Lincolnshire
 Bradley, North Yorkshire
 Bradley, Staffordshire
 Bradley (ward), Lancashire
 Bradley, West Midlands
 Bradley, West Yorkshire, near Huddersfield
 Bradley in the Moors, Staffordshire
 Bradley Green, Cheshire
 Bradley Green, Gloucestershire
 Bradley Green, Worcestershire
 Bradley Stoke, Gloucestershire

In Wales:
 Bradley, Wrexham

In the United States
 Bradley, Arkansas
 Bradley, California
 Bradley Junction, Florida, also known as Bradley
 Bradley, Georgia
 Bradley, Illinois
 Bradley, Louisville, Kentucky
 Bradley, Maine, a New England town
 Bradley (CDP), Maine, village in the town
 Bradley, Michigan
 Bradley, Nebraska
 Bradley, Ohio
 Bradley, Oklahoma
 Bradley, South Carolina
 Bradley, South Dakota
 Bradley, Boone County, West Virginia
 Bradley, Raleigh County, West Virginia
 Bradley, Wisconsin, a town
 Bradley (community), Lincoln County, Wisconsin, within the town
 Bradley County, Arkansas
 Bradley County, Tennessee
 Bradley Township, Jackson County, Illinois

Other places
 Bradley Land, a phantom island in the Arctic reported by Frederick Cook

Facilities and structures 
 Bradley (house), a National Trust property in England
 Harold C. Bradley House in Madison, Wisconsin
 Bradley International Airport in Windsor Locks, Connecticut, USA

Groups, organizations, companies 
 Bradley Academy for the Visual Arts, York, Pennsylvania, USA
 Bradley Foundation, a conservative non-profit foundation in Milwaukee, Wisconsin
 Bradley Pharmaceuticals in New Jersey, USA
 Bradley University, Peoria, Illinois, USA
 W. C. Bradley Co. in Georgia, USA

Vehicles 
 Bradley (automobile), a car manufactured in 1920–1921 in Cicero, Illinois, USA
 Bradley Automotive, a maker of kit cars
 Bradley Fighting Vehicle, armored fighting vehicle
 USS Robert G. Bradley (FFG-49), an Oliver Hazard Perry-class frigate
 SS Carl D. Bradley, a lake freighter, wrecked on Lake Michigan November 18, 1958

Other uses 
 Boo Bradley (1972–2016), a stage name of American professional wrestler Jonathan Rechner also known as Balls Mahoney
 Bradley effect, a discrepancy between voter opinion polls and election outcomes in American elections
 The Bradley method of natural childbirth
 The Bradley method of bush regeneration
 Justice Bradley (disambiguation)

See also
 Bradleys (disambiguation)